Rhain may refer to:

Wales
 Rhain ap Cadwgan or Cloten (fl. 8th century), King of Dyfed and Brycheiniog
 Rhain ap Maredudd (died c. 808), king of Rhainwg (Dyfed)
 Rhain the Irishman (Rhain Yscot) (fl. 11th-century), Irish pretender who held Dyfed

Slovenia
 Rhain or Rain is an ancient form of the former German name Rann of the town of Brežice and Brežice Castle (Schloss Rhain, or Schloss Rann)